I din röst (In your voice) is an album by the Swedish singer Charlotte Perrelli, released on 5 July 2006. It peaked at 29th place on the Swedish music charts. It is a tribute album to Monica Zetterlund. Most of the tracks are Zetterlund covers, but also features some original tracks from Charlotte Perrelli.

Track listing
I din röst
Trubbel
Gröna små äpplen (Little Green Apples)
Mister Kelly
Monicas vals
Elinor Rydholm
När min vän
Sakta vi gå genom stan (Walkin' My Baby Back Home)
Nu är det gott att leva
Nu har jag fått den jag vill ha
När Charlie är född
Tillägnan

Charts

References

2006 albums
Charlotte Perrelli albums
Tribute albums